The 1933 Rice Owls football team was an American football team that represented Rice University as a member of the Southwest Conference (SWC) during the 1933 college football season. In its fifth and final season under head coach Jack Meagher, the team compiled a 3–8 record (1–5 against SWC opponents) and was outscored by a total of 137 to 56.

Schedule

References

Rice
Rice Owls football seasons
Rice Owls football